The Kurit Dam is a masonry arch dam located 34 km southeast of Tabas, Iran near the village of Kurit. The dam is an early arch dam constructed by the Mongolians around 1350 AD.

Dam
The dam was originally 60m tall but 4m of height was added in 1850. The dam was constructed in a very narrow gorge and was the tallest in the world up until the early 20th century. The dam also contained a water outlet system considered sophisticated for its time. Currently, the dam does not impound a reservoir and a large segment of its lower downstream face has fallen off. Behind the dam, where the reservoir existed, is now full of silt with the exception of directly behind the upstream face which has been excavated.

History 
Kurit Dam belongs to the post-Islamic historical periods and is located in the village of Kurit, Tabas city, Iran.

References

Buildings and structures completed in 1350
Infrastructure completed in the 14th century
Dams in South Khorasan Province
Archaeological sites in Iran
Masonry dams
Buildings and structures in South Khorasan Province